The Stecknadelhorn (4,241 m) is a mountain in the Pennine Alps in Switzerland. It lies on the Nadelgrat, a high-level ridge running roughly north–south above the resort of Saas Fee to the east, and the Mattertal to the west.

It was first climbed by Oscar Eckenstein and Matthias Zurbriggen on 8 August 1887.

The Stecknadelhorn is part of the Mischabel range, which culminates at the Dom (4,545 m).

See also

List of 4000 metre peaks of the Alps

References
 Dumler, Helmut and Willi P. Burkhardt, The High Mountains of the Alps, London: Diadem, 1994

External links
 
 "The Nadelgrat".  SummitPost.org.

Alpine four-thousanders
Mountains of the Alps
Mountains of Valais
Pennine Alps
Mountains of Switzerland